Michael A. Hiltzik (born November 9, 1952) is an American columnist, reporter and author who has written extensively for the Los Angeles Times. In 1999, he won a beat reporting Pulitzer Prize for co-writing a series of articles about corruption in the music industry with Chuck Philips. He won two Gerald Loeb Awards for Distinguished Business and Financial Journalism.

Career
He was a journalist at the Buffalo Courier-Express in (Buffalo, New York) in 1974–1978 and bureau chief in 1976–1978. He was a staff writer at the Providence Journal-Bulletin (Providence, Rhode Island) 1979–1981. He joined The Los Angeles Times as a financial writer from 1981–1983 and was its financial correspondent in New York City 1982–1988, Nairobi bureau chief 1988–1993, Moscow correspondent 1993–1994. He was a financial staff writer, editor, and columnist at the Times 1994–2006.
More recently, he began writing a column about business and economic issues in the US West Coast.

In 1985, he shared a Gerald Loeb Award Honorable Mention for Large Newspapers for "Takeovers". He won Silver Gavel award from the American Bar Association and the Overseas Press Club cited his reporting on East African issues. In 1996 he was a finalist for two Pulitzer Prizes for his reporting on health care issues in California and his reporting on a major entertainment merger between Disney and ABC.

Along with Times staff writer Chuck Philips, Hiltzik won the 1999 Pulitzer Prize for their series on corruption and bribes in the music industry. The year-long series exposed corruption in the music business in three different areas: The Academy of Recording Arts and Sciences raised money for an ostensible charity that netted only pennies on the dollar for its charity; radio station "payola," for airplay of new recordings; and the proliferation of exploitive and poorly conceived medical detox programs for celebrities.  Mark Saylor, then entertainment editor of the business section of the paper, said it was gratifying because it recognized "aggressive reporting on the hometown industry . . . where The LA Times has long labored under a cloud, the misperception that ...[they]... were soft on the entertainment industry". The series led to the removal of C. Michael Green, then Grammy chief.

In 2004, Hiltzik won a Gerald Loeb Award for Commentary.

Controversy

Sockpuppet suspension
In 2006, Hiltzik was suspended without pay from the LA Times for sockpuppeting on his blog "The Golden State". Hiltzik admitted to posting under false names on multiple sites, using the pseudonym "Mikekoshi" to criticize commentators Hugh Hewitt and Patrick Frey. In December 2009, the LA Times announced that Hiltzik would be returning to the paper as a business columnist.

Mocking unvaccinated COVID deaths
Hiltzik was criticized for a January 10, 2022 column, where he encouraged public humiliation of unvaccinated people who died from COVID-19. He said, "mockery is not necessarily the wrong reaction to those who publicly mocked anti-COVID measures and encourage others to follow suit, before they perished of the disease the dangers of which they belittled".

Books

Radio interviews
Hiltzik has been interviewed about internet privacy matters on talk radio shows such as the Norman Goldman Show.

References

Further reading
  book review of Dealers of Lightning

External links
 
 Michael Hitzik on Twitter
 Inquiring Minds interview with Michael Hiltzik about Big Science

American newspaper reporters and correspondents
American male writers
1952 births
Living people
Columbia University Graduate School of Journalism alumni
Colgate University alumni
Pulitzer Prize for Beat Reporting winners
The Providence Journal people
Los Angeles Times people
American male bloggers
American bloggers
American business writers
American technology writers
American foreign policy writers
American male non-fiction writers
Gerald Loeb Award winners for Large Newspapers
Gerald Loeb Award winners for Columns, Commentary, and Editorials
21st-century American non-fiction writers